The pku, alternatively spelled pzuk,(in Armenian “Պկու”)  is an Armenian musical instrument, similar to a clarinet. It has been called the national instrument of Armenia. The pku is a single-reed aerophone with seven holes and a one octave range with the open cone of a bull horn at one end.

See also 
 Erkencho
 Erke
 Shofar

References

External links
Karen Hakobyan, the master who prepares this instrument

Armenian musical instruments
Clarinets